The 1984 Arkansas gubernatorial election was held on November 6, 1984. Incumbent Governor Bill Clinton won reelection with a 25% margin of victory over Jonesboro businessman Woody Freeman. This was the last gubernatorial election in Arkansas before the implementation of Amendment 63, lengthening the term of the governor of Arkansas from two to four years. Winning his third of five terms as Governor of Arkansas, Clinton continued to serve this office until shortly after he was elected to the presidency in 1992.

Democratic primary

Democratic nominee 
 Bill Clinton, incumbent Governor

Republican primary

Republican Nominee 
 Woody Freeman, businessman

Campaign 
During Governor Clinton's reelection campaign, he pointed to efforts in pushing through strong education reform including competency tests for new and working teachers and raising pay for most of Arkansas teachers, using anger from the Arkansas teachers’ unions to his advantage. Freeman attacked Clinton on not focusing on economic issues, pledging not to raise taxes and running the state government more like a business. Freeman saw some high profile visits from prominent Republicans, including then President Ronald Reagan,  who campaigned for Freeman. During a rally for the Reagan/Bush reelection campaign just days before election day Reagan told an audience, "Please send Woody Freeman to the Statehouse." Former Secretary of State Henry Kissinger also campaigned for Freeman during the election but seemed to have little of substance to offer the Arkansas candidate, and Governor Clinton on the campaign trail attacked the visit saying that, "I hope Mr. Kissinger tells us everything he knows about what Arkansas needs, and I hope my opponent tells Mr. Kissinger everything he knows about what Arkansas needs in a utility contractor."

Result

See also 
 United States presidential election in Arkansas, 1984

References

Gubernatorial
1984
Arkansas
Bill Clinton